Bodil Holmström (born 19 June 1981) is a Finnish orienteering competitor. She won a bronze medal in the relay at the 2001 Junior World Orienteering Championships in Miskolc. She competed at the World Games in 2009, where she won a silver medal in the relay, and placed 7th in the sprint and 12th in the middle distance. At the 2009 World Orienteering Championships in Miskolc she won a bronze medal with the Finnish relay team.

References

External links

1981 births
Living people
Finnish orienteers
Female orienteers
Foot orienteers
World Orienteering Championships medalists
World Games silver medalists
Competitors at the 2009 World Games
Junior World Orienteering Championships medalists